Cowlands is a hamlet at the head of Coombe Creek southeast of Playing Place in Cornwall, England. According to the Post Office the population at the 2011 Census was included in the civil parish of Truro.

References

Hamlets in Cornwall